Alvin Junior "A. J." Shepherd (June 11, 1926 – May 8, 2005) was an American race car driver.

Career
Born in Chester, Arkansas, he drove in the USAC Championship Car series, racing in the 1960–1961 seasons with 7 starts, including the 1961 Indianapolis 500. He finished in the top ten 4 times, with his best finish in 4th position, in 1961 at Springfield.  He finished 26 in his only race at Indy. He also, raced in the IMCA circuit in the 1950s, and CRA California.

Death
Shepherd died in Miami, Oklahoma after living much of his life in Wichita, Kansas.

References

External links
A. J. Shepherd Crash
Shepherd's Later Years
Stats
Extended Stats

1926 births
2005 deaths
Racing drivers from Arkansas
Indianapolis 500 drivers